Dummy Ache is a 1936 American short comedy film directed by Leslie Goodwins. It was nominated for an Academy Award at the 9th Academy Awards in 1936 for Best Short Subject (Two-Reel). The Academy Film Archive preserved Dummy Ache in 2013.

Cast
 Edgar Kennedy - Edgar
 Florence Lake - Florence
 Jack Rice - Florence's Brother
 Dot Farley - Florence's Mother
 George J. Lewis - The Actor
 Lucille Ball - The Actress
 Harry Bowen - The Cabbie
 Billy Franey - Man with Pitchfork
 Bobby Burns - Bit Role (uncredited)

References

External links

1936 films
RKO Pictures short films
American black-and-white films
Films directed by Leslie Goodwins
1936 comedy films
1936 short films
American comedy short films
1930s English-language films
1930s American films